NRP Corte-Real (F332) is a  operated by the Portuguese Navy. She was laid down by Howaldtswerke-Deutsche Werft on 20 October 1989, launched on 22 November 1991, and commissioned on 1 February 1992. The ship is named in honor of the explorers of the Corte-Real family: João Vaz Corte-Real, Gaspar Corte-Real, Miguel Corte-Real, and Vasco Anes Corte-Real.

References

External links 
 

1991 ships
Ships built in Kiel
Vasco da Gama-class frigates